Cockayne Soup is an EP by the Gazette released on May 28, 2003.
The first pressings of this CD were limited to 5000 copies. A limited edition came in a digipack form. Also, the lyrics insert 
that came with the limited edition contains pictures not included in the regular edition.

The tracks from this EP are featured on the compilation album Dainihon Itangeishateki Noumiso Gyaku Kaiten Zekkyou Ongenshuu, along with Spermargarita and Akuyuukai.

Track listing

Note
"Shiawase na Hibi" is a re-recording of the initial track from the Gozen 0-ji no Trauma Radio single, released in 2002.

References

http://www.jame-world.com

The Gazette (band) albums
2003 EPs

ja:COCKAYNE SOUP